Broadwood is a mixed-use suburb of Kalgoorlie-Boulder, a city in the Eastern Goldfields region of Western Australia.

It contains a small residential area, an industrial area in the west adjoining West Kalgoorlie, the Kalgoorlie-Boulder Airport in the south, and large areas of undeveloped bushland.

References